Ronald P. Hughart (born June 18, 1961) is an American animator, director, and storyboard artist. He has worked on several shows, including The Ren & Stimpy Show, Family Dog, Futurama and American Dad!.
He also worked on Ren & Stimpy as a layout supervisor and timing director. Hughart currently works on American Dad! as co-supervising director with Brent Woods.

During his work on Futurama, supervising director Rich Moore said that Ron had directed some of the best scenes of violence on the show. This was noted on the audio commentary of Raging Bender.

Directing credits

Futurama episodes 
"A Fishful of Dollars" (with Gregg Vanzo)
"Fry and the Slurm Factory"
"Raging Bender"
"War Is the H-Word"
"A Tale of Two Santas"
"Bendin' in the Wind"
"The 30% Iron Chef"
"Bender Should Not Be Allowed on TV"
"The Farnsworth Parabox"

American Dad! episodes 
"Pilot"
Supervising Director season 1
Co-Supervising Director season 2, 3,4,5,6

The Ren and Stimpy Show episodes 
Haunted House
The Cat That Laid The Golden Hairball
Ren's Pecs
Jimminy Lummox
Jerry the Bellybutton Elf
Eat My Cookies
House of Next Tuesday
I Love Chicken
Pixie King
Feud for Sale

Others 
 Peter in Magicland (supervising animator)
 ¡Mucha Lucha!: The Return of El Maléfico (direct-to-video film)

External links 

1961 births
Living people
American animators
American animated film directors
American television directors
American storyboard artists